Alan Kenneth Soper (born 1951) FRS is an STFC Senior Fellow at the ISIS neutron source based at the Rutherford Appleton Laboratory in Oxfordshire.

Education
Soper was educated at the Campion School, Hornchurch and the University of Leicester where he was awarded a Bachelor of Science degree followed by a PhD in 1977 for research into the structure of aqueous solutions conducted at the Institut Laue–Langevin in Grenoble supervised by John Enderby.

Career
Before moving to RAL in 1997, Soper was a postdoctoral researcher and assistant professor in the Physics Department at the University of Guelph, Ontario in Canada and a staff member at the Los Alamos National Laboratory at Los Alamos, New Mexico in the United States.

Research
Soper's research investigates molecular-level structures in structurally disordered systems. Soper was chair of the prestigious Gordon Research Conference on Water and Aqueous Solutions in 2008 and is the co-designer of the Near and InterMediate Range Order Diffractometer (NIMROD) instrument on the ISIS neutron source.

Soper is a world expert in the structure of water and water-based solutions at the molecular level. Using experimental techniques such as neutron and X-ray diffraction, combined with computer simulation and structure refinement, Soper investigates the organisation and behaviour of water molecules, including their interaction with other molecules and surfaces. His work has relevance given the importance of water in the biochemical processes of living organisms.

He has characterised the structure of water under extreme conditions – as found miles down at the bottom of the ocean – and in heavily confined water such as occurs in nanoscopic mineral cavities. He has observed that this water is likely to be under significant tension – about −1000 atmospheres.

Awards and honours
Soper was elected a Fellow of the Royal Society (FRS) in 2014. His nomination reads: 

Soper was made an ISIS neutron source senior research fellow in 2009.

References

Living people
1951 births
Alumni of the University of Leicester
British physicists
Fellows of the Royal Society
People from Hornchurch
Science and Technology Facilities Council